Sprüth Magers is a commercial art gallery owned by Monika Sprüth and Philomene Magers, with spaces in London, Berlin, Los Angeles and offices in Cologne, Hong Kong, New York and Seoul. The gallery represents over sixty artists and estates, including John Baldessari, George Condo, Peter Fischli & David Weiss, Andreas Gursky, Jenny Holzer, Barbara Kruger, David Ostrowski, and Rosemarie Trockel.

History
In February 1983, Monika Sprüth opened her first gallery in Cologne with a focus on female artists.
Emblematic of this perspective is Sprüth's publishing venture Eau de Cologne: an "effervescent, shape-shifting magazine, featuring almost exclusively women artists and art practitioners – which she published, with accompanying exhibitions, three times between 1985 and 1989". Combining theoretical discourse with visual practice, Eau de Cologne "gave artists such as Trockel, Barbara Kruger, Jenny Holzer, Cindy Sherman, and Louise Lawler a European venue to pursue their own self-making and critical empowerment". The first two editions in 1985 and 1987 were edited solely by Sprüth and featured early work by Sherman and Kruger as cover art.

While Sprüth's interest and belief in the influence of women was a notable aspect of her gallery, she also had an important role in developing the early careers of such artists as conceptualists Peter Fischli & David Weiss, photographers Andreas Gursky and Thomas Demand, and painters Andreas Schulze, George Condo, Axel Kasseböhmer, and Thomas Scheibitz. All of these artists are still represented by Sprüth and Magers more than thirty-five years later.

It was also in Cologne that Philomene Magers opened her gallery in 1991, with a focus primarily on post-war figures including Donald Judd, Robert Morris, Dan Flavin, Ad Reinhardt, John Baldessari, Richard Artschwager, and Ed Ruscha.

Sprüth and Magers cooperated for many years before their complementary programmes and shared interests led them to run the galleries together since 1998. As J.S. Marcus writes in an Art + Auction article from 2009, this convergence created "a powerhouse on the European art scene. Serving as a primary gallery for some of the world's most important artists – including the German photographers Andreas Gursky and Thomas Demand and the American artists Cindy Sherman and Jenny Holzer – Sprüth Magers symbolized Cologne's importance as an art center". In 2015 Monika Sprüth and Philomene Magers were placed at number 13 in ArtReview's "Power 100" list of the 100 most influential people in the contemporary art world. The gallery constantly expands its roster of artists, more recently with younger artists such as Pamela Rosenkranz, David Ostrowski, Kaari Upson and Cao Fei, as well as the estates of Bernd and Hilla Becher, Craig Kauffman, Otto Piene and Hanne Darboven. The intention of the gallery is to show the artists who have a long-term cultural significance. Therefore, KRAFTWERK was included in the gallery program, with their importance for music history and visual understanding. Following their initial merger, Sprüth Magers expanded further with a gallery space in Munich and a London gallery in 2003, located on Berkeley Street in Mayfair first and on Grafton Street since 2007. The latest expansion of Sprüth Magers is an office in Seoul.

Locations
Sprüth Magers has galleries in Berlin, Los Angeles and London as well as offices in Cologne, Hong Kong, and Seoul.

In 2007, Sprüth Magers London moved to a new Mayfair location on Grafton Street where it remains. The gallery was named by a 2008 Evening Standard article as one of the "London Galleries to Watch". As author Ben Lewis describes, "With its 19th century carved wood and glass façade, Sprüth Magers gets my vote for the most beautiful gallery in London. This, the London outpost of Germany's leading blue-chip contemporary art gallery, has only been open in its present form for a year, and brings the rigour of German taste in international conceptual artists, photographers and new generation painters to London".

Central among the gallery's locations is the Berlin space, which opened in October 2008 and is located in the heart of the Mitte district a block away from, "the city's premier non-commercial venue for emerging artists". Drawn to Berlin by its lively artistic discourse, multiculturalism and geographical location at the heart of Europe, Sprüth Magers' relocation is both a sign of and a contributing factor to Berlin's ascent as a site of "art-world significance often compared to New York's in the '70s". For, as Axel Lapp states in an article from Art Review, Sprüth Magers Berlin is "not so much a gallery as a museum space in a former dancehall on Oranienburger Strasse". Its inaugural show "sculptures by the local Dresden-born artist Thomas Scheibitz, known for his colorful assemblages" and an exhibition by American artist George Condo.

In 2016, Sprüth Magers opened a U.S. location in Los Angeles with new work by American Conceptual artist John Baldesssari, a 14,000-square-foot, two-storey space designed by West Coast architects Pereira & Associates, across the street from the Los Angeles County Museum of Art. The space's interior was designed by architects Andreas Lechthaler and Botho von Senger und Etterlin.

Artists represented 
Sprüth Magers represents several living artists, including:

In addition, the gallery manages various artist estates, including: 

The gallery has in the past represented several other artists, including: 
 Cindy Sherman (–2021)

References

Sources
 Leitch, L. "The greats go head to head in The Times Modern Art 200", The Times — Times 2, 13 April 2009, pp. 2–4.
 Princethal, N. "Jenny Holzer", After the Revolution. Women Who Transformed Contemporary Art. New York: Prestel, 2007, pp. 144–167.
 Wright, B. "Art Business", Apollo, January 2009, p. 66.

External links
Sprüth Magers official website
 Sprüth Magers homepage on artnet.com
 "The Other Half", Frieze magazine article on female gallerists

Contemporary art galleries in London
Art galleries established in 1998
Contemporary art galleries in Germany
Photography museums and galleries in England
Photography museums and galleries in Germany